The Australasian Performing Right Association Awards of 2012 (generally known as APRA Awards) are a series of related awards which include the APRA Music Awards, Art Music Awards, and Screen Music Awards. The APRA Music Awards of 2012 was the 30th annual ceremony by the Australasian Performing Right Association (APRA) and the Australasian Mechanical Copyright Owners Society (AMCOS) to award outstanding achievements in contemporary songwriting, composing and publishing. The ceremony was held on 28 May 2012 at the Sydney Convention and Exhibition Centre. The Art Music Awards were introduced in 2011 to replace the Classical Music Awards (last held in 2009) and were distributed on 3 April at the Sydney Opera House. They are sponsored by APRA and the Australian Music Centre (AMC) to "recognise achievement in the composition, performance, education and presentation of Australian music". The Screen Music Awards were issued on 19 November by APRA and Australian Guild of Screen Composers (AGSC), which "acknowledges excellence and innovation in the genre of screen composition".

On 2 May nominations for the APRA Music Awards were announced on multiple news sources, with Lanie Lane being the most nominated artist. Hosts for the 2012 APRA Music Awards were Missy Higgins and Jonathan Biggins. A total of 12 awards were presented. Sydney-based talent agent, Mary Lopez, was honoured with the Ted Albert Award for Outstanding Services to Australian Music. Gotye (aka Wally de Backer) received the most awards, winning Songwriter of the Year, Song of the Year and Most Played Australian Work. The APRA Music Awards ceremony is due to be broadcast on the MAX network on 12 June 2012.

Presenters
At the APRA Music Awards, aside from the hosts, Missy Higgins and Jonathan Biggins, the presenters were Yusuf Islam, Felicity Urquhart, Philip Mortlock and New South Wales Premier, Barry O'Farrell.

Performances
The APRA Music Awards ceremony showcased performances by:
 Tina Arena featuring Tex Perkins – "Somebody That I Used to Know"
 Kate Miller-Heidke – "You Should Consider Having Sex With a Bearded Man"
 Bob Evans – "I Started a Joke"
 Kram – "Oh Well, That’s What You Get For Falling in Love With a Cowboy"
 Russell Morris and PVT – "The Real Thing"
 Sophia Brous – "Cameo Lover"
 Bertie Blackman – "Brother"

APRA Music Awards

Blues & Roots Work of the Year

Breakthrough Songwriter of the Year

Country Work of the Year

Dance Work of the Year

International Work of the Year

Most Played Australian Work

Rock Work of the Year

Song of the Year

Urban Work of the Year

Most Played Australia Work Overseas

Songwriter of the Year
Gotye

Ted Albert Award for Outstanding Services to Australian Music
Mary Lopez

Art Music Awards

Work of the Year – Instrumental

Work of the Year – Jazz

Work of the Year – Orchestral

Work of the Year – Vocal or Choral

Performance of the Year

Award for Excellence by an Organisation or an Individual

Award for Excellence in Music Education

Award for Excellence in a Regional Area

Award for Excellence in Experimental Music

Award for Excellence in Jazz

Distinguished Services to Australian Music

Screen Music Awards

International Achievement Award

Feature Film Score of the Year

Best Music for an Advertisement

Best Music for Children's Television

Best Music for a Documentary

Best Music for a Mini-Series or Telemovie

Best Music for a Short Film

Best Music for a Television Series or Serial

Best Original Song Composed for the Screen

Best Soundtrack Album

Best Television Theme

Most Performed Screen Composer – Australia

Most Performed Screen Composer – Overseas

References

2012 in Australian music
2012 music awards
APRA Awards